Psalm 103 is the 103rd psalm of the Book of Psalms, beginning in English in the King James Version: "Bless the , O my soul". The Book of Psalms is part of the third section of the Hebrew Bible, and a book of the Christian Old Testament. In Latin, it is known as "Benedic anima mea Domino". The psalm is a hymn psalm.

In the slightly different numbering system used in the Greek Septuagint and Latin Vulgate translations of the Bible, this psalm is Psalm 102.

The first verse (the sub-heading in most English translations) attributes the psalm to King David. The psalm forms a regular part of Jewish, Catholic, Lutheran, Anglican and other Protestant liturgies. The psalm has been paraphrased in hymns, and has often been set to music.

Background and themes
Baptist preacher and biblical commentator Charles Spurgeon suggests that the psalm was written in David's later life, as seen by the psalmist's focus on the frailty of life and his "higher sense of the preciousness of pardon, because a keener sense of sin". Spurgeon divides the psalm into three sections:
 Verses 1–5: The Psalmist's personal experience of God's compassion;
 Verses 6–19: The attributes of God as seen in his interactions with his people;
 Verses 20–22: The Psalmist's call to all creatures to join him in blessing God.

Lutheran minister Ernst Wilhelm Hengstenberg notes that the number of verses in the psalm parallels the 22 letters of the Hebrew alphabet, and that the concluding words repeat the opening words, "finishing" and "rounding off" the psalm into a complete whole. Nonconformist minister Matthew Henry also notes this circular form, stating: "Blessing God and giving him glory must be the alpha and the omega of all our services".

The Midrash Tehillim offers several explanations of the first verse, among them:
Rabbi Levi said in the name of Rabbi Hama: A sculptor makes a statue; the sculptor dies, but his sculpture endures. It is not thus with the Holy One, blessed be He. The Holy One made man, and man dies, but the Holy One lives and endures. … Another comment: A sculptor makes a statue, but cannot make a soul or vital organs. But the Holy One made a statue, man, and within him made a soul and vital organs.

But Patrick D. Miller also sees Psalm 103 as a logical extension of Psalm 102, pointing out that "one may see [Psalm] 102 as opening issues and questions to which [Psalm] 103 offers the solution or answer". For example, in Psalm 102 the psalmist blames his illness and pain on God's "indignation and anger" (verse 10), while Psalm 103 makes it clear that divine anger is not the final word, nor will it last forever.

Text

Hebrew Bible version

King James Version
 Who forgiveth all thine iniquities; who healeth all thy diseases;
 Who redeemeth thy life from destruction; who crowneth thee with lovingkindness and tender mercies;
 Who satisfieth thy mouth with good things; so that thy youth is renewed like the eagle's.
 The  executeth righteousness and judgment for all that are oppressed.
 He made known his ways unto Moses, his acts unto the children of Israel.
 The  is merciful and gracious, slow to anger, and plenteous in mercy.
 He will not always chide: neither will he keep his anger for ever.
 He hath not dealt with us after our sins; nor rewarded us according to our iniquities.
 For as the heaven is high above the earth, so great is his mercy toward them that fear him.
 As far as the east is from the west, so far hath he removed our transgressions from us.
 Like as a father pitieth his children, so the  pitieth them that fear him.
 For he knoweth our frame; he remembereth that we are dust.
 As for man, his days are as grass: as a flower of the field, so he flourisheth.
 For the wind passeth over it, and it is gone; and the place thereof shall know it no more.
 To such as keep his covenant, and to those that remember his commandments to do them.
 The  hath prepared his throne in the heavens; and his kingdom ruleth over all.

Textual witnesses
Some early manuscripts containing the text of this chapter in Hebrew are of the Masoretic Text tradition, which includes the Aleppo Codex (10th century), and Codex Leningradensis (1008).

The extant palimpsest Aq includes a translation into Koine Greek by Aquila of Sinope in c. 130 CE, containing verses 1–13.

Uses

Judaism
Verse 1 is the final verse of Nishmat.

Verses 2, 10, and 13 are recited during Selichot.

Verses 10, 13, and 14 are part of the Tachanun prayer. Verse 14 is also recited during a burial service.

Verse 17 is recited during the blessings before the Shema on the second day of Rosh Hashanah.

Verse 19 is part of the Yehi kevod prayer recited during Pesukei Dezimra.

New Testament
Verse 17 is quoted in Mary's song of praise, the Magnificat, in Luke .

Catholic Church

In the Western church, this psalm was traditionally performed during the celebration of Matins of Saturday by the order of St. Benedict, probably since its founding to 530.

In the Liturgy of the Hours, Psalm 103 is sung or recited during the Office of Sunday readings, second week. It is also used for Mass readings: it is the psalm read at the Mass of the Sacred Heart in Year A of the three-yearly cycle. In ordinary time, we find the 7th and the 24th Sunday of the year A and the eighth Sunday of the year B. In Lent, it is played the 3rd and 7th Sunday. Finally, it is the 7th Psalm on Easter Sunday.

Orthodox Church
In the Eastern Orthodox Church this psalm is one of the six psalms of Orthros (Matins) read every morning outside of Bright Week. It is also the first of the "Typical Psalms" of the Typica, which is read in place of the Divine Liturgy when the latter is not celebrated on days it is permitted to be. It is frequently sung as the first antiphon of the Divine Liturgy, but there it is often replaced by another antiphon on great feasts and on many weekdays, and is always thus replaced in Greek practice (except on Mount Athos).

Protestant
R. J. Thesman finds in this psalm a declaration that God never betrays us, never abandons us, and never forgets ..... His mercy covers our mistakes and our human tendencies, while Thomas Coke, calls it an exquisite performance, very applicable to every deliverance: it may properly be said to describe the wonders of grace. This Psalm is one continued hymn of praise, and includes a comprehensive view of the goodness of Jehovah, in all the great works of creation and redemption, while Albert Barnes called it exceedingly regular in its structure and composition; beautiful in its language and conceptions; adapted to all times and ages; suited to express the feelings of gratitude to God for deliverance from trouble, and for the manifestation of his mercy; suited to elevate the soul, and to fill it with cheerful views.

The Old Testament scholar Bernhard Duhm considers the Psalm a "compilation of all sorts of beautiful sentences from a fairly extensive reading".

Musical settings
Psalm 103 is the basis of several hymns. A paraphrase of Psalm 103 in German is "Nun lob, mein Seel, den Herren", written by Johann Gramann in 1525, which was translated by Catherine Winkworth as "My Soul, now Praise thy Maker!" and published in 1863. English hymns include "Praise, my soul, the King of Heaven", written in the nineteenth century by Henry Francis Lyte, as well as "Sing to the Lord and praise him"; and “Like as a Father” by Florence Margaret Spencer Palmer.

In the 16th century, Claudin de Sermisy set the psalm. In the 17th century, Henry Dumont set this psalm for La Chapelle Royale au Louvre (1666).

In contemporary music, the song "Bless the Lord" in the musical Godspell is based on this psalm. "10,000 Reasons (Bless the Lord)" by Matt Redman and Jonas Myrin takes lyrics from this psalm, as does "The Lord is Gracious and Compassionate" by Vineyard Worship.

References

Sources

External links 

 
 
 Text of Psalm 103 according to the 1928 Psalter
 Psalms Chapter 103 text in Hebrew and English, mechon-mamre.org
 Bless the LORD, my soul; all my being, bless his holy name! United States Conference of Catholic Bishops
 Psalm 103:1 introduction and text, biblestudytools.com
 Psalm 103 – Help Quickly, O Lord enduringword.com
 Psalm 103 / Refrain: Come to me quickly, O God. Church of England
 Psalm 103 at biblegateway.com
 Tehillim – Psalm 103 (Judaica Press) translation with Rashi's commentary at Chabad.org

103
Works attributed to David